Stu Hart: Lord of the Ring (also known as Lord of the Ring - An Inside Look at Wrestling's First Family) is a 2002 biography of Canadian professional wrestler and promoter Stu Hart, written by journalist Marsha Erb and published by ECW Press. The book is generally considered to be the most in-depth work on Hart's life and career.

Background
The book was authorized by the Hart family and published by ECW Press. Erb had worked with the family previously as the lawyer of Jim Neidhart, one of Hart's sons-in-law.

Content
The book begins by focusing of Hart's grandfather and father's lives to give context to what kind of man Stu turned out to become. The book chronicles hart's childhood with his father, mother and two sisters living in poverty on the Canadian prairie during the early 1910s and 1920s, his amateur wrestling time, military service and early career as an in ring performer as well as the courtship of his future wife Helen Smith before moving on to his time as a promoter and trainer of Stampede Wrestling. The book spends a lot of time centring around Harts experiences as a father to his twelve children (Smith, Bruce, Keith, Wayne, Dean, Ellie, Georgia, Bret, Alison, Ross, Diana and Owen), and how he managed to raise them all while handling Stampede Wrestling.

The book, like most other biographies of wrestlers focuses on the period after the great depression, especially after World War Two but offers general insight into the early wrestling industry in western Canada.

The book also features over thirty photographs on the courtesy of the Hart family.

Reception
The Wrestling Observer Newsletter described the book as the most comprehensive work ever written about Hart's life, which covers his life all up until almost the end.

Sports journalist Heath McCoy expressed in his acclaimed book Pain and Passion: The History of Stampede Wrestling which chronicles the wrestling territory which Hart owned and managed that the book's description of the deal which turned over ownership of the promotion to Vince McMahon may heve been inaccurate. The book implies that the deal was sealed with a verbal agreement but Pain and Passion states that other sources indicated that there was indeed a written agreement. McCoy stated that the book nonetheless was of great value to him when writing Pain and Passion. He also stated that the book confirmed a few stories from the controversial book Under the Mat which was written by Hart's youngest daughter, Diana, published a few years earlier. McCoy elaborated on these in Pain and Passion.

The reviewer of ProWrestlingBooks.com expressed that the book is one of the better wrestler biographies out there. They also stated that while the book has an exceptional lot of stories from the promotion the book functions best as a coverage of an individual life story and that it should not be confused for a coverage of the Stampede Wrestling territory which some may be expecting. Hart's second oldest son, Bruce, stated that he thought the book definitely was nice but that due to his father's personality and dedication to the wrestling business readers are hardpressed to learn much about the industry since his father revealed almost nothing about it.

See also
 Bret "Hitman" Hart: The Best There Is, the Best There Was, the Best There Ever Will Be
 Hart House
 Hart Dungeon
 The Hart Foundation
 The Hart Dynasty
 Hart & Soul

References

External links
 Stu Hart: Lord of the Ring at ECWPress.com

2002 non-fiction books
Professional wrestling biographies
Stu Hart
Books about sportspeople
Hart wrestling family books